Maxatawny is an unincorporated community located on U.S. Route 222 in Maxatawny Township, Berks County, Pennsylvania, United States, five miles east of Kutztown. It is in the Lehigh watershed and Schaefer Run flows through it to the Little Lehigh Creek. Maxatawny has a post office, with the ZIP code of 19538. Traffic speed on US 222 is reduced to 35 miles-per-hour passing through the village, which borders Lehigh County.

Demographics

Etymology

The community took its name from Masatane Township.

History
A post office called Maxatawny was established in 1829.

Notes

Unincorporated communities in Berks County, Pennsylvania
Unincorporated communities in Pennsylvania